Sixth Corps Area was a Corps area, effectively a military district, of the United States Army from 1921 to the 1940s. The headquarters was established at Fort Sheridan, Illinois, in August 1920, from portions of the former Central Department, but then moved to the U.S. Post Office Building at 1819 West Pershing Road in Chicago on 10 October 1921.

The corps area covered the states of Wisconsin, Michigan and Illinois and Jefferson Barracks, Missouri. It was responsible for the mobilization, administration, and training of units of the Second and Fifth Armies, I Cavalry Corps (Regular Army, but inactive, 1927-1940), VI Army Corps (6th Division, 32d and 33rd Divisions) and XVI Army Corps (85th, 86th, 101st Divisions), select GHQ Reserve units, the Zone of the Interior support units of the Sixth Corps Area Support Command, and 21st Airship Group at Scott Field, Illinois (12 August 1936-19 February 1939). 2d Balloon Squadron was assigned to Sixth Corps Area from 20 May 1930 - 30 December 1940.

On 24 March 1923, the 21st Aero Squadron was reconstituted as the 21st Observation Squadron of the United States Army Air Service. The Army activated the unit as a "Regular Army Inactive" squadron, meaning that although it was a Regular Army unit, it was manned with reserve personnel. It was assigned to the 9th Observation Group in the Sixth Corps Area. The 21st's designated Active Associate unit was the 15th Observation Squadron, at Chanute Field, Illinois, which was also its designated mobilization station. In 1927 it was withdrawn from the Sixth Corps Area and reassigned to the Fourth Corps Area.
	
Paul Malone was promoted to Major General and assumed command of the Sixth Corps Area in Chicago in 1928. Malone then left the United States in April 1929 and embarked for a new assignment in the Philippines.

Major active duty installations in the corps area included Fort Brady, Chanute Field, Camp Custer, Jefferson Barracks, Scott Field, Fort Sheridan, and Fort Wayne. Camp Douglas and Camp Grant were among the National Guard installations.

Lieutenant General (AUS) Walton Walker was assigned as the commander of the succeeding Sixth Service Command and the Fifth Army, headquartered in Chicago, from May 1946 to September 1948. He was then sent to Japan.

Commanders 
The commanders of the Sixth Corps Area were: 

Maj. Gen. Leonard Wood 20 August 1920–2 April 1921
Maj. Gen. George Bell Jr. 2 April 1921–3 October 1922
Brig. Gen. George V.H. Moseley  3 October 1922–2 December 1922   
Maj. Gen. Harry Clay Hale 2 December 1922–10 July 1925 
Maj. Gen. William S. Graves 12 July 1925–25 October 1926 
Brig. Gen. Michael Joseph Lenihan 25 October 1926–9 March 1927
Maj. Gen. William Lassiter 9 March 1927–17 March 1928 
Maj. Gen. Paul B. Malone 17 March 1928–6 April 1929
Maj. Gen. Frank Parker 7 April 1929–1 November 1933 
Maj. Gen. Preston Brown 22 October 1933–16 October 1934   
Brig. Gen. Frank C. Bolles 16 October 1934–1 February 1935 
Maj. Gen. Frank Ross McCoy 1 February 1935–1 May 1936
Maj. Gen. Johnson Hagood 2 May 1936–7 May 1936 
Brig. Gen. Dana T. Merrill 7 May 1936–14 May 1936
Brig. Gen. Charles D. Herron 14 May 1936–1 June 1936
Maj. Gen. Charles E. Kilbourne Jr. 1 June 1936–17 December 1936
Maj. Gen. Charles D. Herron 17 December 1936–15 September 1937
Maj. Gen. Hugh Drum 15 September 1937–31 October 1938
Maj. Gen. Stanley H. Ford 5 November 1938–10 October 1940
Maj. Gen. Charles Hartwell Bonesteel Jr. 10 October 1940–26 July 1941
Maj. Gen. Joseph M. Cummins 26 July 1941–28 March 1942
Major General George Grunert (until September 1942)
Major General Henry Aurand (until November 1944) 
Major General Russell Reynolds (until 23 May 1945)
Major General David McCoach Jr.

References

Sources

 
Millett, John D. (1954). The Organization and Role of the Army Service Forces (PDF). Washington, D.C.: Office of the Chief of Military History, Department of the Army. OCLC 631289493.

 6
Military units and formations established in the 1920s